The Nantes–Brest canal is a French canal which links the two seaports of Nantes and Brest through inland Brittany. It was built in the early 19th century, and its total length as built was 385 km with 238 locks.

History
Brittany started developing its waterway network in 1538 when it decided to improve navigation on the River Vilaine. The project for a canal throughout the province was conceived by an 'inland navigation commission' convened in 1783. When Brest was blockaded by the English fleet Napoleon decided to build the canal to provide a safe inland link between the two largest military ports of the French Atlantic front. Building started in 1811, and Napoleon III presided over the canal's opening in 1858.

This was the most ambitious canal project ever completed in France, 360km long with 238 locks. The canal was closed as a through route in 1920, when a section was submerged by Guerlédan dam (PK 227), a short distance west of the junction with the canalised river Blavet at Pontivy. The dam was supposed to be equipped with ladder of locks, receiving for this a significant subsidy from the state but this was never done. The entire length of waterway west of Guerlédan was officially closed in 1957, and the 21km length from Pontivy to Guerlédan also subsequently fell into disuse. At the same time, the disappearance of all commercial traffic (in 26m long barges carrying up to 140 tonnes) resulted in the gradual silting up of the canal section between Rohan and Pontivy.

The canal has been revived and ownership has been transferred from the State to Brittany Region, except for the short length in Pays de la Loire region.

Navigation 
Navigation is no longer possible between Pontivy and Goariva. Guerlédan reservoir flooded the canal over a length of 10 km including 17 locks. However, a length of 15 km with 10 locks has been restored upstream of Guerlédan reservoir to the heritage site of La Pitié Chapel, creating a navigation 25 km long, and a public consultation was held in 2017 with a view to lifting the ban on thermal engines on this section.

Three separate navigable sections are thus presented in the route below.

En Route

Canal de Nantes à Brest (East) 
Pontivy to Nantes 206 km via 107 locks (using successively the rivers Erdre, Isac, Vilaine and Oust)
 PK 2 Nantes
 PK 15 Sucé-sur-Erdre
 PK 21 Left turn onto the Erdre River at Nort-sur-Erdre
 PK 42.5 La Chevallerais
 PK 50 Blain
 PK 95 Redon
 PK 132 Malestroit
 PK 157.5 Josselin
 PK 182 Rohan
 PK 191.3 Saint-Gonnery begins the 5 km summit level
 PK 205.9 Pontivy, junction with the river Blavet.
Navigation interrupted from Pontivy to Guerlédan dam

Guerlédan–La Pitié section 
 PK 226.8 Guerlédan dam
 PK 252.4 La Pitié

Finistère or western section 
 PK 81 Goariva
 PK 73 Port-de-Carhaix, end of canal section, navigation enters canalized river Hyères
 PK 63 Maison du Canal at confluence of Hyères and Aulne rivers
 PK 43.5 Châteauneuf-du-Faou
 PK 0 Châteaulin

Tidal river Aulne and roadstead of port of Brest 
 PK 0 Châteaulin
 PK 29 Landévennec.

 PK 32.5 Mouth of Aulne River
 PK 51 Roadstead of Brest Brest Harbor, Brest Bay

See also
 List of canals in France

References

External links
 Canal de Nantes à Brest with information on places, ports and moorings on the canal, by the author of Inland Waterways of France, Imray
 Navigation details for 80 French rivers and canals (French waterways website section)

Transport in Brittany
Transport in Brest, France
Transport in Nantes
Nantes-Brest
Buildings and structures in Brest, France
Buildings and structures in Nantes
Canals opened in 1858